Hercules in the Vale of Woe (/ Maciste vs Hercules in the Valley of Woe), a.k.a. Hercules in the Valley of Woe, is a 1961 Italian Franco and Ciccio comedy film directed by Mario Mattoli and starring Kirk Morris as Maciste and Frank Gordon as Hercules.  The film is a comical take on the popular sword-and-sandal epics of the 1950s and 1960s.

Plot
In Milan, a major theater entrepreneur's going to put on a show period piece set in the era of mythological Greece. However, by a lucky accident, the company of actors and the entrepreneur himself are catapulted back in time just at the time of invincible warriors and heroes of Homer and Hesiod. Now we learn that the king Eurystheus needed to drive to Hercules, the invincible hero, able to defeat his arch enemy Maciste, who wants to kidnap his girlfriend Deianira.

Cast
 Kirk Morris as Maciste
 Frank Gordon as Hercules
 Franco Franchi as Francheo
 Ciccio Ingrassia as Ingrassiade
 Bice Valori
 Mario Carotenuto
 Gianna Cobelli
 Carlo Croccolo
 Sandra Mondaini
 Liana Orfei
 Ombretta Ostenda
 Raimondo Vianello

Release
Hercules in the Valley of Woe was released in Italy on 19 December 1961.

References

External links

1961 films
1961 comedy films
1960s fantasy comedy films
1960s parody films
Italian parody films
Italian fantasy comedy films
Peplum films
1960s Italian-language films
Films directed by Mario Mattoli
Italian crossover films
Films about Heracles
Maciste films
Films about time travel
Films scored by Gianni Ferrio
Sword and sandal films
1960s Italian films